The Organization for International Economic Relations (OiER) (in German: Organisation für Internationale Wirtschaftsbeziehungen) is a global non-profit, non-governmental organization based in Vienna, Austria. It is a network that focuses on building partnerships and identifying trends in a global context and addressing key future-oriented issues in areas of sustainability, innovation, communication, environment, energy and mobility.

History 
OiER was established in 1947 in Vienna as Donaueuropäisches Institut and in 1972, changed its name to the Organization for International Economic Relations. Due to its status as global platform since its establishment, the Organization has been awarded consultative status with the United Nations Economic and Social Council (ECOSOC) in 1947 and in 1973 with the European Council. OiER has been working in close cooperation with UN agencies and other international organizations since 1973. In 2011, OiER received consultative status with the United Nations Industrial Development Organization (UNIDO).

Main areas of work 

The organization is a global network of businesses, governments and international organizations that enables access to information on business and project development, focusing on financing, resource mobilization, strategic marketing and communication support. Through its vast network of international partners, including UN agencies, other international organizations, governments, businesses, academia and research, OiER is further focusing on global development projects.

OiER's main development areas and project topics include energy, environment, urban development, smart cities, health, medical infrastructure, food supply, agro-business, as well as education and youth employment.

Projects undertaken by OiER in cooperation with its international partners, are in alignment with the United Nations Sustainable Development Goals 2030, to combine in the global effort in working towards the fulfillment of the Sustainable Development Goals until 2030.

Cooperation 
OiER is in close cooperation with the United Nations International Development Organization (UNIDO), United Nations Economic Council for Europe (UNECE), UN-Habitat, United Nations Educational, Scientific and Cultur Organization (UNESCO), International Atomic Energy Agency (IAEA) – PACT Programme; the OPEC Fund for International Development (OFID), as well as other national and international organizations.

References 

 Archive OiER

External links 

Global smart cities programme United Smart Cities
OiER CSR Quick Impact Fund Team4Action

International organisations based in Austria
International nongovernmental organizations
International sustainability organizations
International organisations based in Vienna